Caladenia applanata subsp. erubescens, commonly known as the rose spider orchid, is a species of orchid endemic to the south-west of Western Australia. It is a relatively common orchid with a single erect, hairy leaf and up to three uniformly pink, sweet-smelling flowers which have a broad, flattened labellum.

Description 
The sepals have narrow, light brown, club-like glandular tips. The dorsal sepal is erect and the lateral sepals and petals spread stiffly near their bases, then turn downwards. Flowering occurs from September to late October. This subspecies differs from subspecies applanata in having pink flowers.

Taxonomy and naming
Caladenia erubescens was first formally described in 2001 by Stephen Hopper and Andrew Phillip Brown. Hopper and Brown described two subspecies including Caladenia applanata subsp. erubescens and the description was published in Nuytsia. The subspecies name (erubescens) is a Latin word meaning "growing red", "redden" or "blush", referring to the pink colour of the flowers of this orchid.

Distribution and habitat 
The rose spider orchid grows in low heath in coastal areas between William Bay and Albany in the Warren biogeographic region.

Conservation
Caladenia applanata subsp. erubescens is classified as "not threatened" by the Western Australian Government Department of Parks and Wildlife.

References

applanata
Orchids of Western Australia
Endemic orchids of Australia
Plants described in 2001
Taxa named by Stephen Hopper
Taxa named by Andrew Phillip Brown